= Yemen and Gulf University for Science and Technology =

Private university in Sana'a, Yemen

Yemen and Gulf University For Science and Technology
- جامعة اليمن والخليج للعلوم والتكنولوجيا
- Type: Private
- Established: 2014
- Location: Main campus: Sana'a, Yemen
- Website: https://ygu.edu.ye/

Yemen and Gulf University For Science and Technology (YGUST) (Arabic: جامعة اليمن والخليج للعلوم والتكنولوجيا) is a private university located in Sana'a, Yemen. The university was established in 2014 and provides undergraduate education programs in medical, engineering, information technology, administrative, and humanities fields.

== History ==
The Yemen and the Gulf University for Science and Technology was founded in 2014 as a private higher education institution in Yemen. The university aims to contribute to higher education development through academic programs and professional training.

== Colleges and programs ==
The university includes several colleges offering undergraduate programs, including:

=== College of Medical Sciences ===
Programs include:

- Dentistry
- Medical Laboratory Sciences
- Nursing

=== College of Engineering and Information Technology ===
Programs include:

- Information Technology
- Communication Engineering
- Computer Engineering

=== College of Administrative Sciences and Humanities ===
Programs include:

- Management Information Systems
- Accounting
- Business Administration
- Political Science
- English Language
- Translation

== Branches ==
The university has branches in:

- Al Hudaydah
